Purrington's Cat Lounge (sometimes Purringtons Cat Lounge or simply Purringtons) was a cat café in Portland, Oregon, in the United States. The establishment billed itself as "the first cat cafe and adoption center in the Pacific Northwest".

Description and history
Purrington's opened on January 24, 2015, on Martin Luther King Jr. Boulevard in the northeast Portland part of the Boise neighborhood. More than 300 people attended its opening. The business was owned by Kristen and Sergio Castillo. Kristen was inspired to pursue the venture in October 2013, when she saw her friend share a video from Le Café des Chats in Paris. Purrington's partnered with the Sherwood-based rescue organization Cat Adoption Team (CAT) to facilitate cat adoptions.

The cafe was expected to close in November 2018. However, ownership transferred to Garrett Simpson and Helen Harris in January 2019. After being closed for nine months and undergoing a renovation, Purrington's reopened in February 2020. In September 2022, Simpson and Harris announced plans to close in November.

References

External links 

 

2015 establishments in Oregon
2022 disestablishments in Oregon
Animal welfare
Boise, Portland, Oregon
Cat organizations
Coffeehouses and cafés in Oregon
Defunct restaurants in Portland, Oregon
Northeast Portland, Oregon
Restaurants disestablished in 2022
Restaurants established in 2015